Transtillaspis hepaticolorana is a species of moth of the family Tortricidae. It is found in Carchi Province, Ecuador.

The wingspan is about 24 mm.  The ground colour of the forewings is ferruginous, suffused with brown in the dorsal part of the wing and partly along the costa and subterminally. The base of the wing, part of the termen and the spots between markings are blackish brown. The markings are brown. The hindwings are brownish grey, but creamer basally where rust scales are present.

Etymology
The species name refers to the colouration of the forewings and is derived Greek/Latin hepar (meaning liver).

References

Moths described in 2008
Transtillaspis
Taxa named by Józef Razowski